The 2016/17 Super 8 was the 29th Season of the Super 8 (Handball League), and the 5th since re-organising to the Super 8 name and format in 2012.

Warrington Wolves win the League while Hawks finish second.

Teams

The following 8 teams competed in the 2016/17 Super 8 (Handball League)
Cambridge HC
Coventry Sharks
London GD Handball Club
NEM Hawks
Nottingham
Olympia
Warrington Wolves
West London Eagles

League table

References

Premier Handball League seasons
2016 in handball
2017 in handball